Gabriel Torres may refer to:

Gabriel Torres (born 1988), Panamanian football forward
Gabriel Torres (athlete) from Puerto Rican records in track and field
Gabriel Torres (cinematographer) for The Woman Hunter
Gabriel Torres Garcés, producer of Los signos del zodiaco
Gabriel Torres Villaseñor from National Prize for Arts and Sciences (Mexico)